The anime series Eyeshield 21 is based on the manga series of the same name written by Riichiro Inagaki and illustrated by Yusuke Murata. The series is directed by Masayoshi Nishida and produced by TV Tokyo, NAS and Gallop. The plot of the episodes follows Sena Kobayakawa, a student who becomes an American football player against his desire but eventually becomes the star of the team, wearing an eyeshield to protect his identity.

Before the anime series was aired, Production I.G announced in August 2003 the production of an original video animation (OVA) that was released on Jump Festa Anime Tour 2003. The production of anime Eyeshield 21 was announced by Weekly Shōnen Jump at the end of 2004. Eyeshield 21 aired between April 6, 2005, and March 19, 2008, on TV Tokyo. The episodes were later released in thirty-six DVD compilations between July 22, 2005, and June 25, 2008, by Bandai Visual.

Viz Media and Cartoon Network released a dubbed version of Eyeshield 21 on the internet video streaming service Toonami Jetstream; the video was available on December 17, 2007. However, it was not completed due to Toonami Jetstream's defunct. Section23 Films through Sentai Filmworks released the first fifty-two episodes on four subtitled-only DVDs between May 18, 2010, and February 8, 2011.

The series use twelve pieces of theme music: five opening and seven ending themes. The ending themes are "Be Free" by Ricken's, "Blaze Away" by The Trax, "Goal" by Beni Arashiro, "Run to Win" by Aya Hirano, Miyu Irino, Koichi Nagano and Kappei Yamaguchi, "A day dreaming..." by Back-On, "Flower" by Back-On, and "Song of Power" by Short Leg Summer. Singles have been released of the individual songs, an original soundtrack and other four CDs were also released by Avex.

Episode list

Episodes 1–72

Episodes 73–145

OVAs

Media release

Japanese release
Bandai Visual released thirty-six DVD compilations between July 22, 2005, and June 25, 2008.

English release
Sentai Filmworks released four DVD compilations between May 18, 2010, and February 8, 2011.

References

Eyeshield 21